Thomas Reis (born 4 October 1973) is a German former professional footballer, who is currently the head coach of Bundesliga club Schalke 04.

Managerial career

VFL Bochum
After previously serving as the women’s team and as the academy’s head coach, VFL Bochum appointed Reis as manager, who guided them to promotion to the Bundesliga in the 2020-21 season. However, after Bochum’s worst start to a Bundesliga season in their history, Reis was sacked in September 2022.

Schalke 04
In October 2022, Reis was appointed as manager of Bundesliga strugglers Schalke 04.

Career statistics

Managerial statistics

References

External links
Profile at the FC Schalke 04 website

Thomas Reis

1973 births
Living people
People from Wertheim am Main
Sportspeople from Stuttgart (region)
Association football defenders
Association football midfielders
German footballers
Germany youth international footballers
Germany under-21 international footballers
VfB Stuttgart players
Eintracht Frankfurt players
VfL Bochum players
VfL Bochum II players
FC Augsburg players
SV Eintracht Trier 05 players
SV Waldhof Mannheim players
Bundesliga players
2. Bundesliga players
2. Bundesliga managers
German football managers
Footballers from Baden-Württemberg
VfL Bochum managers
FC Schalke 04 managers
Regionalliga players
Oberliga (football) players
West German footballers